Bill Millar (born 20 May 1950) is a Canadian former international soccer player.

Career  
Millar played with Toronto City in 1971, and the following season played in the National Soccer League with Hamilton Italo-Canadians. In 1973, he played with league rivals London City. He played with Hamilton City in 1974, and later with Welland Lions Croatia and St. Catharines Roma.

In 2012, he was inducted into the Hamilton Soccer Hall of Fame. In 2014, the Ontario Soccer Association awarded Millar with the Ontario Soccer Meritorious Service Award.

International career 
Millar made his debut for the Canada men's national under-23 soccer team on 8 June 1971 against Mexico. He represented Canada in the 1971 Pan American Games. He made his senior debut on 5 August 1973 against the United States in a friendly  match.

Managerial career 
After playing college soccer with the McMaster Marauders, he became a teacher. He was head coach of the Brock Badgers for 31 seasons until retiring in 2016. In 2019, he was named the head coach for Hamilton United Elite's U15 girl's Ontario Player Development League (OPDL) program.

References

External links

1950 births
Living people
Canadian soccer players
Canada men's international soccer players
Scottish emigrants to Canada
Association footballers not categorized by position
Canadian soccer coaches
Canada men's under-23 international soccer players
Pan American Games competitors for Canada
Footballers at the 1971 Pan American Games
London City players
St. Catharines Roma Wolves players
Canadian National Soccer League players
Soccer people from Ontario
Sportspeople from Lennoxtown